Zola Helen Ross (May 9, 1912 – November 20, 1989) (née Girdey) was a Pacific Northwest writer. She also taught writing and co-founded the Pacific Northwest Writers Association with Lucile Saunders McDonald of The Seattle Times. She wrote in various genres, including adventure, children's fiction, crime, mystery, and suspense. She was also the author of several Western historical novels; her male counterpart was Louis L'Amour. The Pacific Northwest and the Great Basin are the settings for her stories, and they include the towns of Reno, San Francisco, and Seattle. Ross occasionally wrote under the pseudonyms Helen Arre and Bert Iles. She taught writing at the University of Washington and the Lake Washington schools in Kirkland, Washington. She was married to William Frank Ross, and lived in Seattle, Washington.

Selected publications
 (1946) Three Down Vulnerable
 (1947) Overdue For Death
 (1948) One Corpse Missing
 (1949) Bonanza Queen
 (1950) Tonopah Lady
 (1951) Reno Crescent
 (1952) The Green Land
 (1954) Cassy Scandal
 (1955) The Golden Witch
 (1956) A Land To Tame
 (1957) Spokane Saga

Using pseudonym Helen Arre
 (1953) The Corpse By The River
 (1954) No Tears At The Funeral
 (1956) Write It Murder
 (1958) The Golden Shroud
 (1960) Murder By The Book

Using pseudonym Bert Iles
 (1956) Murder In Mink

Co-authored with McDonald
 (1950) The mystery of Castesby Island
 (1952) Stormy year
 (1954) Fridays̓ child
 (1956) Mystery of the long house
 (1956) Pigtail pioneer
 (1957) Wing Harbor
 (1958) The courting of Ann Maria
 (1959) Assignment in Ankara
 (1961) Winter's answer
 (1959) The stolen letters
 (1968) The sunken forest

References

1912 births
1989 deaths
University of Washington faculty
American women novelists
Pseudonymous women writers
Western (genre) writers
Writers from Seattle
20th-century American novelists
20th-century American women writers
Novelists from Washington (state)
Organization founders
American women academics
20th-century pseudonymous writers